In mathematics, a Kakeya set, or Besicovitch set, is a set of points in Euclidean space which contains a unit line segment in every direction. For instance, a disk of radius 1/2 in the Euclidean plane, or a ball of radius 1/2 in three-dimensional space, forms a Kakeya set. Much of the research in this area has studied the problem of how small such sets can be. Besicovitch showed that there are Besicovitch sets of measure zero.

A Kakeya needle set (sometimes also known as a Kakeya set) is a (Besicovitch) set in the plane with a stronger property, that a unit line segment can be rotated continuously through 180 degrees within it, returning to its original position with reversed orientation. Again, the disk of radius 1/2 is an example of a Kakeya needle set.

Kakeya needle problem
The Kakeya needle problem asks whether there is a minimum area of a region  in the plane, in which a needle of unit length can be turned through 360°. The minimum area for convex sets is achieved by an equilateral triangle of height 1 and area 1/, as Pál showed.

Kakeya seems to have suggested that the Kakeya set  of minimum area, without the convexity restriction, would be a three-pointed deltoid shape. However, this is false; there are smaller non-convex Kakeya sets.

Besicovitch needle sets

Besicovitch was able to show that there is no lower bound > 0 for the area of such a region , in which a needle of unit length can be turned around. That is, for every , there is region of area  within which the needle can moved through a continuous motion that rotates it a full 360 degrees. This built on earlier work of his, on plane sets which contain a unit segment in each orientation. Such a set is now called a Besicovitch set. Besicovitch's work showing such a set could have arbitrarily small  measure was from 1919. The problem may have been considered by analysts before that.

One method of constructing a Besicovitch set  (see figure for corresponding illustrations) is known as a "Perron tree" after Oskar Perron who was able to simplify Besicovitch's original construction:

The first observation to make is that the needle can move in a straight line as far as it wants without sweeping any area. This is because the needle is a zero width line segment. The second trick of Pál, known as Pál joins describes how to move the needle between any two locations that are parallel while sweeping negligible area. The needle will follow the shape of an "N". It moves from the first location some distance  up the left of the "N", sweeps out the angle to the middle diagonal, moves down the diagonal, sweeps out the second angle, 
and them moves up the parallel right side of the "N" until it reaches the required second location. The only non-zero area regions swept are the two triangles of height one and the angle at the top of the "N".

The construction starts with any triangle with height 1 and some substantial angle at the top through which the needle can easily sweep. The goal is to do many operations on this triangle to make its area smaller while keeping the directions though which the needle can sweep the same. 
First consider dividing the triangle in two and translating the pieces over each other so that their bases overlap in a way that minimizes the total area.
The needle is able to sweep out the same directions by sweeping out those given by the first triangle, jumping over to the second, and then sweeping out the directions given by the second. The needle can jump triangles using the "N" technique because the two lines at which the original triangle was cut are parallel.

Now, suppose we divide our triangle into 2n subtriangles. The figure shows eight.
For each consecutive pair of triangles, perform the same overlapping operation we described before to get half as many new shapes, each consisting of two overlapping triangles. Next, overlap consecutive pairs of these new shapes by shifting them
so that their bases overlap in a way that minimizes the total area. Repeat this n times until there is only one shape. Again, the needle is able to sweep out the same directions by sweeping those out in each of the 
2n subtriangles in order of their direction.  The needle can jump consecutive triangles using the "N" technique because the two lines at which these triangle were cut are parallel.

What remains is to compute the area of the final shape. The proof is too hard to present here. Instead, we will just argue how the numbers might go.
Looking at the figure, one sees that the 2n subtriangles overlap a lot. All of them overlap at the bottom, half of them at the bottom of the left branch, a quarter of them at the bottom of the left left branch, and so on. 
Suppose that the area of each shape created with i merging operations from 2i subtriangles is bounded by Ai.
Before merging two of these shapes, they have area bounded be 2Ai. 
Then we move the two shapes together in the way that overlaps them as much as possible. 
In a worst case, these two regions are 
two 1 by ε rectangles perpendicular to each other so that they overlap at an area of only ε2. But the two shapes that we have constructed, if long and skinny, point in much of the same direction because they are made from consecutive groups of subtriangles. 
The handwaving states that they over lap by at least 1% of their area. Then the merged area would be bounded by 
Ai+1 = 1.99 Ai. The area of the original triangle is bounded by 1. Hence, the area of each subtriangle is bounded by 
A0 = 2-n and the final shape has area bounded by 
An = 1.99n × 2-n. In actuality, a careful summing up all areas that do not overlap gives that the area of the final region is much bigger, namely, 1/n. 
As n grows, this area shrinks to zero.
A Besicovitch set can be created by combining six rotations of a Perron tree created from an equilateral triangle.
A similar construction can be made with parallelograms

There are other methods for constructing Besicovitch sets of measure zero aside from the 'sprouting' method. 
For example, Kahane uses Cantor sets to construct a Besicovitch set of measure zero in the two-dimensional plane.

In 1941, H. J. Van Alphen showed that there are arbitrary small Kakeya needle sets inside a circle with radius 2 + ε (arbitrary ε > 0). Simply connected Kakeya needle sets with smaller area than the deltoid were found in 1965. Schoenberg conjectured that this number is the lower bound for the area of simply connected Kakeya needle sets. However, in 1971, F. Cunningham showed that, given ε > 0, there is a simply connected Kakeya needle set of area less than ε contained in a circle of radius 1.

Although there are Kakeya needle sets of arbitrarily small positive measure and Besicovich sets of measure 0, there are no Kakeya needle sets of measure 0.

Kakeya conjecture

Statement
The same question of how small these Besicovitch sets could be was then posed in higher dimensions, giving rise to a number of conjectures known collectively as the Kakeya conjectures, and have helped initiate the field of mathematics known as geometric measure theory.  In particular, if there exist Besicovitch sets of measure zero, could they also have s-dimensional Hausdorff measure zero for some dimension s less than the dimension of the space in which they lie? This question gives rise to the following conjecture:

Kakeya set conjecture: Define a Besicovitch set in Rn to be a set which contains a unit line segment in every direction. Is it true that such sets necessarily have Hausdorff dimension and Minkowski dimension equal to n?

This is known to be true for n = 1, 2 but only partial results are known in higher dimensions.

Kakeya maximal function
A modern way of approaching this problem is to consider a particular type of maximal function, which we construct as follows: Denote Sn−1 ⊂ Rn to be the unit sphere in n-dimensional space. Define  to be the cylinder of length 1, radius δ > 0, centered at the point a ∈ Rn, and whose long side is parallel to the direction of the unit vector e ∈ Sn−1. Then for a locally integrable function f, we define the Kakeya maximal function of f to be

where m denotes the n-dimensional Lebesgue measure. Notice that  is defined for vectors e in the sphere Sn−1.

Then there is a conjecture for these functions that, if true, will imply the Kakeya set conjecture for higher dimensions:

Kakeya maximal function conjecture: For all ε > 0, there exists a constant Cε > 0 such that for any function f and all δ > 0, (see lp space for notation)

Results
Some results toward proving the Kakeya conjecture are the following:
 The Kakeya conjecture is true for n = 1 (trivially) and n = 2 (Davies).
 In any n-dimensional space, Wolff showed that the dimension of a Kakeya set must be at least (n+2)/2.
 In 2000, Katz,  Łaba, and Tao proved that the Minkowski dimension of Kakeya sets in 3 dimensions is strictly greater than 5/2.
 In 2000, Jean Bourgain connected the Kakeya problem to arithmetic combinatorics which involves harmonic analysis and additive number theory.

Applications to analysis
Somewhat surprisingly, these conjectures have been shown to be connected to a number of questions in other fields, notably in harmonic analysis.  For instance, in 1971, Charles Fefferman was able to use the Besicovitch set construction to show that in dimensions greater than 1, truncated Fourier integrals taken over balls centered at the origin with radii tending to infinity need not converge in Lp norm when p ≠ 2 (this is in contrast to the one-dimensional case where such truncated integrals do converge).

Analogues and generalizations of the Kakeya problem

Sets containing circles and spheres
Analogues of the Kakeya problem include considering sets containing more general shapes than lines, such as circles.

 In 1997 and 1999, Wolff proved that sets containing a sphere of every radius must have full dimension, that is, the dimension is equal to the dimension of the space it is lying in, and proved this by proving bounds on a circular maximal function analogous to the Kakeya maximal function.

 It was conjectured that there existed sets containing a sphere around every point of measure zero. Results of Elias Stein proved all such sets must have positive measure when n ≥ 3, and Marstrand proved the same for the case n=2.

Sets containing k-dimensional disks
A generalization of the Kakeya conjecture is to consider sets that contain, instead of segments of lines in every direction, but, say, portions of k-dimensional subspaces. Define an (n, k)-Besicovitch set K to be a compact set in Rn containing a translate of every k-dimensional unit disk which has Lebesgue measure zero. That is, if B denotes the unit ball centered at zero, for every k-dimensional subspace P, there exists x ∈ Rn such that (P ∩ B) + x ⊆ K. Hence, a (n, 1)-Besicovitch set is the standard Besicovitch set described earlier.

The (n, k)-Besicovitch conjecture: There are no (n, k)-Besicovitch sets for k > 1.

In 1979, Marstrand  proved that there were no (3, 2)-Besicovitch sets. At around the same time, however, Falconer  proved that there were no (n, k)-Besicovitch sets for 2k > n. The best bound to date is by Bourgain, who proved in that no such sets exist when 2k−1 + k > n.

Kakeya sets in vector spaces over finite fields
In 1999, Wolff posed the finite field analogue to the Kakeya problem, in hopes that the techniques for solving this conjecture could be carried over to the Euclidean case.

Finite Field Kakeya Conjecture: Let F be a finite field, let K ⊆ Fn be a Kakeya set, i.e. for each vector y ∈ Fn there exists x ∈ Fn such that K contains a line {x + ty : t ∈ F}. Then the set K has size at least cn|F|n where cn>0 is a constant that only depends on n.

Zeev Dvir proved this conjecture in 2008, showing that the statement holds for cn = 1/n!. In his proof, he observed that any polynomial in n variables of degree less than |F| vanishing on a Kakeya set must be identically zero. On the other hand, the polynomials in n variables of degree less than |F| form a vector space of dimension

Therefore, there is at least one non-trivial polynomial of degree less than |F| that vanishes on any given set with less than this number of points. Combining these two observations shows that Kakeya sets must have at least |F|n/n! points.

It is not clear whether the techniques will extend to proving the original Kakeya conjecture but this proof does lend credence to the original conjecture by making essentially algebraic counterexamples unlikely. Dvir has written a survey article on  progress on the finite field Kakeya problem and its relationship to randomness extractors.

See also
 Nikodym set

Notes

References

External links
Kakeya at University of British Columbia 
Besicovitch at UCLA
Kakeya needle problem at mathworld
Dvir’s proof of the finite field Kakeya conjecture at Terence Tao's blog
An Introduction to Besicovitch-Kakeya Sets

Harmonic analysis
Real analysis
Discrete geometry